Victoria Park Collegiate Institute (commonly known as Victoria Park C.I., Victoria Park, Vic Park, VP, and VPCI); formerly Victoria Park Secondary School, is a collegiate institute in Toronto, Ontario, Canada. It is located south of York Mills Road and west of Victoria Park Ave. in the district of North York. It is the first publicly funded school in Ontario to host the International Baccalaureate Diploma Programme. Authorized to offer the IB Diploma Programme since July 1987, the programme is taught in English. The school is open to male and female students. Some feeder schools include Milne Valley Middle School and Donview Middle School. The student population of Victoria Park Collegiate Institute is diverse, with a component of English as Second Language students (over 30%).

History
Victoria Park Collegiate Institute was officially opened to students in 1960.

Approximately two decades after its founding, Victoria Park C.I. became the first public school within Ontario to offer the International Baccalaureate Program.

In the late 2000s, a fitness center was opened which goes by the name of "Brian Maxwell Fitness Centre". This was to dedicate Brian Maxwell and his contributions to this school, as well as his passing in 2004.

Throughout 2016-2018, many renovations had occurred in the school with new additions such as a new and improved resource room, a remodeled gym, an improved track field, revamped parking lots, a cell phone charging station, and repainted walls/doors.

Academical achievements

Provincial assessment
For the year 2010/2011,
Grade 9 EQAO Mathematics assessment: 89% of all students were at or above the provincial standard (level 3 and above), compared with 81% for the Toronto District School Board.
Grade 10 Ontario Secondary School Literacy Test: 86% of first-time eligible students who participated fully successfully passed the assessment, compared with 81% for the Toronto District School Board.

International Baccalaureate program 

Victoria Park C.I. was the first public school in Ontario to offer the International Baccalaureate Diploma Program, beginning in 1987. Grade nine and ten students are admitted into a pre-IB program at Victoria Park where they are given the opportunity to gauge the IB curriculum. Individuals who wish to apply for the pre-IB program must complete a math test and then write a student application essay of 400-500 words. Afterwards, the applicant must attend an interview with the IB Coordinator in order to complete the application process.

IB graduates from Victoria Park C.I. consistently score in the top 10% worldwide, with many individuals in the top 5%. In the graduating class of 2013, 16 students out of 94 achieved a total score of 40 points or above, including one student who scored 44 points.

Sports, teams, and clubs
Sports offered at Victoria Park C.I. include:
Curling
Baseball
 The Varsity Boys' Baseball offered again in the 2006-2007 school year
Volleyball
Soccer
Archery
 The archery team was started in 2002 and has won a medal every year since 2003.
 Girls' Field Hockey
Tennis
Ultimate Frisbee
Badminton
Rugby
 Resumed in the fall of 2010 after a 15-year hiatus
Ice Hockey
Aquatics
Basketball
Track and Field
Water Polo
 The Varsity Girls' Water Polo team was the TDSB North Region champion in 2015 and 2016

Competitive clubs include:
Chess
The Senior chess team placed first at the city championships and 2nd overall at the provincial championships in 2009-2010.
In 2018, the Senior chess team took first place again in the Toronto Secondary School Chess League (TSSCL) Team Championships. The junior team tied for first, but placed second on tiebreak.
Robotics
The robotics club has mainly two subdivisions, one for VEX Robotics Competition, and another one for FIRST Robotics Competition.
The FIRST team has won several awards since the year of 2014.

VPCI also has its student-led orchestra that is not limited to students taking music classes.

VPCI also has a yearbook committee who works every year to deliver and design the school's annual yearbook.

Library

Victoria Park C.I., like all high schools in the TDSB, has a resourceful library. The library offers over 20 workstations, two computer labs, independent study areas, printing services, and photocopying service. The library is also the home to over a thousand books of all genres. The library occasionally holds fundraisers for the Hospital for Sick Children and much more.

Some programs on the hundreds of computers (which run on Windows 7 and Windows 10) are Turing programming software, Microsoft Office 2010, and graphic editors such as Adobe Photoshop. The Accelerated Reader software is offered, with which grade nine students are encouraged to read and are tested afterwards on the content of the novel they chose. Victoria Park CI also has many carts of laptops which run on Windows 7 as well.

White Pine at VP

The White Pine high school reading program started in Victoria Park C.I. in the spring of 2003. Every year at the beginning of semester two, a meeting is held in the school library to gather students who are interested in participating in this reading program. All books nominated for White Pine are young adult fictions written by Canadian authors. The ten nominated books are introduced to the students who will have to read at least seven out of the ten selections to be eligible to vote for their favourite book.

A meeting takes place every three weeks in the library where students get an opportunity to discuss, with their peers as well as other teachers, about the books they have read. The voting for the favourite book takes place in mid-May at the school. After all the votes from across Ontario have been accounted for, teachers and students of Victoria Park C.I who have participated in the White Pine reading program are then invited to the ceremony where the winning author of the nominated books is announced.

Notable alumni

Students
Katharine Birbalsingh, headteacher
Brian Maxwell, athlete, founder of PowerBar 
Pierre Browne, sprinter
Bruce Boudreau, Coach of the Vancouver Canucks
Paul Quarrington, author and musician
Dan Hill, singer and songwriter
Michael Coteau, Ontario MPP and Minister for Citizenship and Immigration
Yuanling Yuan, Canadian WIM Chess Master and founder of Chess in the Library.
Jowi Taylor, CBC Radio Broadcaster, and Founder of the Six String Nation project

Staff
Yuri Shymko, politician

See also
List of high schools in Ontario

References

External links

Victoria Park Collegiate Institute's Official Website
TDSB School Info

High schools in Toronto
North York
Schools in the TDSB
International Baccalaureate schools in Ontario